In 1966 the British Lions toured Australia and New Zealand. The Lions won the two test matches against  but lost all four internationals against the All Blacks.

Overall the tourists played thirty-five matches, winning twenty-three, losing nine and drawing three. In Australia the Lions played eight matches, winning seven and drawing the other. In New Zealand they played twenty-five matches, winning fifteen, drawing two and losing eight – in addition to their four test defeats they also lost to Southland, Otago, Wellington and Wanganui-King Country. They also played two matches in Canada, winning one and losing one.

The touring party was captained by Mike Campbell-Lamerton. The manager was Des O'Brien and for the first time a Lions touring team had a coach, John Robins, rather than an assistant manager.

Squad

Management
 Manager D. J. O'Brien (Ireland)
 Coach John Robins (Wales)

Backs

 Terry Price (Llanelli and Wales)
 Don Rutherford (Gloucester and England)
 Stewart Wilson (London Scottish and Scotland)
 Dewi Bebb (Swansea and Wales)
 Barry Bresnihan (University College Dublin and Ireland)
 Sandy Hinshelwood (London Scottish and Scotland)
 Ken Jones (Cardiff and Wales)
 Colin McFadyean (Moseley and England)
 Keith Savage (Northampton and England)
 Jerry Walsh (Sunday's Well and Ireland)
 Stuart Watkins (Newport and Wales)
 Mike Weston (Durham City and England)
 Mike Gibson (Cambridge University and Ireland)
 Allan Lewis Abertillery and Wales)
 David Watkins (Newport and Wales)
 Roger Young (Queen's University R.F.C. and Ireland)

Forwards

 Mike Campbell-Lamerton (capt) (London Scottish and Scotland)
 Derrick Grant (Hawick and Scotland)
 Ken Kennedy (CIYMS and Ireland)
 Frank Laidlaw (Melrose and Scotland)
 Ronnie Lamont (Instonians and Ireland)
 Willie John McBride (Ballymena and Ireland)
 Ray McLoughlin (Gosforth and Ireland)
 Noel Murphy (Cork Constitution and Ireland)
 Howard Norris (Cardiff and Wales)
 Alun Pask (Abertillery and Wales)
 David Powell (Northampton and England)
 Brian Price (Newport and Wales)
 Gareth Prothero (Bridgend and Wales)
 Jim Telfer (Melrose and Scotland)
 Delme Thomas (Llanelli and Wales)
 Denzil Williams (Ebbw Vale and Wales)

Results
Complete list of matches played by the British Isles in Australia and New Zealand:

 Test matches

References

1966 rugby union tours
1966
1966
Rugby union tours of Canada
1966 in Australian rugby union
1966 in New Zealand rugby union
1966 in British sport
Five Nations 
Five Nations 
Five Nations 
Five Nations